Real Humans is a 2012 Swedish science fiction/drama series set in an alternative near-future version of Sweden where consumer-level humanoid robot workers and servants are widespread. The series follows the resulting emotional effects on two families as well as the trials of a group of robots who have attained free will and want their freedom from human ownership.

It premiered on SVT 1 on 22 January 2012. The series was written by Lars Lundström and directed by Harald Hamrell and Levan Akin. As of 2013, the series has been sold to about 50 countries, including Australia, France, Germany, and South Korea. A second season of ten episodes premiered on SVT1 in October 2013. In April 2013 it was announced that Lars Lundström was writing a third series, but as of August 2014, SVT is yet to officially announce whether the series will be renewed for a third season. , Lundström said in an interview with Festival Court Métrange, "We have planned for a third season, we have written a whole outline and some scripts, but right now it's in decision making, if it's going to happen or not, because we have problem to fund the budget money. In a couple of weeks, maximum a month, we know, but I'm sorry to say, I'm not very optimistic.".

Setting 
The story takes place in a version of present-day Sweden where the use of androids is commonplace. The androids, known as hubots (portmanteau of human and robot), function as servants, workers, companions, and even illicitly as sexual partners, with different models having specific features designed for their distinctive roles. While some people embrace this new technology, others are disturbed by it. A far-right political movement, the "real humans", arises in opposition to the encroachment of hubots upon human society. Some members use the derogatory term "Pacmans" to refer to hubots.

Hubots are usually programmed to recognise and obey their owner and can learn skills and pick up knowledge through observation of humans. Hubots have begun to replace human workers in many industries, especially in the performance of repetitive tasks. Though they are designed to closely resemble humans, hubots are usually easy for humans to recognise as they have bright flawless skin, glossy hair and unnaturally bright (usually very blue or very green) eyes. All Hubots also have a USB-like port, in either the back of the neck or in their lower back, which is used for programming and data. The button to activate or de-power a hubot is located under the left armpit, as is a standard wall plug cord for recharging purposes. Hubots require only electricity to survive and must recharge regularly, during which they enter a sleep-like state. Hubot skin feels similar to human skin and is kept at normal human body temperature, but beneath the skin are metal components and a blue fluid/lubricant known as HubFluid.

Hubots are also programmed to be docile. They obey a set of rules called "Asimov" protocols that prevent them from harming humans. However, some hubots have been modified beyond the legal protocols to function as lovers or bodyguards. Such practices are illegal in Sweden and those who modify the programming of the hubots are known as "home-brewers". A small, low-funded branch of the police is set up to investigate hubot related crimes, known as E-HURB. Hubot-human sexual activity is taboo but not uncommon and many hubots are programmed for limited sexual activity. Those who pursue sexual relationships with hubots are derisively called "Hubbies".

Further, those hubots reprogrammed by original hubot creator David Eischer have started to develop feelings, desires and their own goals, attaining an apparent capacity for free will and independence from humans. Their code is designed to integrate and balance various emotions simultaneously as opposed to the one-emotion-at-a time code that standard hubots have. They are still often naïve and unworldly and sometimes fail to understand the nuances of complex human behaviour.

Characters

The Engman Family 
 , Inger Engman, a mother and lawyer
 , Hans Engman, Inger's husband
 , Matilda Engman, the eldest Engman child, who works in a supermarket
 Kåre Hedebrant, Tobias Engman (nicknamed "Tobbe"), a teenage school student
 , Sofia Engman, the youngest Engman daughter
 Sten Elfström, Lennart Sollberg, Inger's father who lives alone with his hubot companion(s)
 , Odi, Lennart's much beloved hubot companion
 , Vera, a less genial hubot designed to look after Lennart's health in old age
 Lisette Pagler, Anita, a hubot that Hans purchases for the family; she has a hidden personality the family discovers .

The Children of David Eischer 
 Andreas Wilson, Leo Eischer, David's son (in flashbacks, 10-year-old Leo is played by )
 Eva Röse, Niska, David Eischer's main hubot assistant, de facto leader of the "free" hubots
 Marie Robertson, Beatrice "Bea", a free hubot with a past closely tied to Leo's. She has been posing as a human named Beatrice Novak, working as both a detective with E-HURB and an anti-hubot activist. She is revealed to be a hubot version of Leo's late mother.
 Lisette Pagler, Mimi, a hubot with free will that seems to have feelings for Leo 
 , Fred, a hubot with free will.
 André Sjöberg, Gordon, a hubot with free will
 Josephine Alhanko, Flash / Florentine, a hubot with free will; in season two, forms an intimate relationship with a human.
 , Marylyn, a hubot with free will

The Engmans' Neighbours 
 Leif Andrée, Roger, neighbour of the Engmans, husband of Therese and adoptive father to Kevin. He is a temperamental warehouse worker, and skeptical of hubots.
 Camilla Larsson, Therese, unhappy wife of Roger, mother of Kevin, and attracted to her hubot trainer. She is a friend of Inger's. Separated from Roger after a violent confrontation over Rick, her hubot.
 , Kevin, Therese's son, and an anti-hubot activist.
 Johannes Bah Kuhnke, Rick, Therese's hubot, who has special (illegal) programming allowing greater empathy and simulated emotion than most hubots

Other major characters

Humans 
 Thomas W. Gabrielsson, David Eischer, Leo's father and the programmer who created the code that allows hubots to attain free will. He is deceased, and seen in flashbacks.
 , Ove Holm, a male detective with E-HURB
 , Malte Koljonen, a volatile anti-hubot activist
 , Pilar, Therese's best friend who works at a gym
 Måns Nathanaelson, Jonas Boberg, owner of the hubot retail store Hubot Market
 Peter Viitanen, Silas, a thief, trafficker and illegal modifier of hubots
 , Åsa, the pastor and wife to Eva. She believes the hubots won't harm anyone.
 Ellen Mattsson, Eva, the vicar's wife who is not fond of hubots
 Shebly Niavarani, Henning, Inger Engman's manager at the lawfirm
 , Magnus, Inger Engman's colleague at the lawfirm
 Karin Bertling, Niska Boberg (in season two), estranged mother of Jonas; an anti-technology recluse with a past connection to David Eischer
 Alexander Karim – Douglas Jarméus, Florentine's husband in season two
 Lars-Erik Berenett – Claes Jarméus – Father of Douglas and owner of Inger's law firm
 Emil Almén – Einar, hubot expert

Hubots 
 , Max, a hubot (handyman model) who assists Leo, and whom Leo has partially liberated from the restrictions of his programming
 Johannes Bah Kuhnke, Rick, Therese's hubot (personal trainer model)
 , Bo, Pilar's hubot
 , Arnold, Jonas' hubot
 Jonas Malmsjö, Luther, a hubot Silas and his partner have hacked to act as a security guard
 Louise Peterhoff – Cloette, a hubot taking care of David Eischer's diseased mother

Note: Most actors playing hubots appear in multiple roles in the series (usually non-speaking) as other copies of the same model.

Episodes

Series 1 (2012)

Series 2 (2013–14)

Reception 
The first season of the program received glowing reviews. Io9's Charlie Jane Anders called the program "startlingly beautiful", disturbing and "creepy as hell". The Australian called it "the best science fiction to hit the small screen in a long time".

Remakes

English-language adaptation 
The rights to an English-language version of the programme were sold to Kudos Film & Television, and the format rights and international distribution to Shine Limited. Called Humans, the English-language version debuted in 2015 on Channel 4 in the UK, on AMC in the US and Canada, and on ABC in Australia. The second season started airing in October 2016. The third season started airing in May 2018 (UK) and June 2018 (US). In May 2019, Channel 4 announced that the series had been cancelled.

Chinese adaptation
On 25 July 2018, it was announced Roland Moore would be head writer on a Chinese version of Humans, produced by Endemol Shine China and Croton Media. The series began airing on Chinese broadcaster Tencent on February 19, 2021.

References

External links 
Swedish TV (SVT)

Facts on season two (NordicFantasy)

Swedish science fiction television series
Swedish drama television series
Sveriges Television original programming
Androids in television
Television series set in the future
Television series by Reveille Productions
Television shows set in Sweden
Hard science fiction
Alternate history television series
Malware in fiction
2012 Swedish television series debuts
2014 Swedish television series endings